Inioteuthis capensis is a species of bobtail squid native to the southeastern Atlantic Ocean, specifically from Lüderitz Bay to Mossel Bay off South Africa.

The type specimen was collected off South Africa and is deposited at the South African Museum in Cape Town.

References

External links
 Inioteuthis capensis on ADW
 

Bobtail squid
Molluscs described in 1962
Taxobox binomials not recognized by IUCN